The Victorian State Football League is a former Australian rules football governing body.

The VSFL was established at the end of 1991 to take over administration of football in Victoria from the Australian Football League, which was now becoming pre-occupied with administration of the game nationally.

The VSFL ran a competition among Australian Football League teams' reserve teams from 1992 until 1999, which was also known as the VSFL from 1992 until 1994, then as the AFL Reserves from 1995 until 1999. The body also ran the Under-18s competition now known as the TAC Cup. At the end of 1994, the VSFL took over administration of the Victorian Football Association competition (which it renamed the Victorian Football League in 1996).

The VSFL was succeeded in an administrative capacity by Football Victoria (later AFL Victoria) at the end of 1999.

VSFL Premiers
The premiers and Grand Final results of the Victorian State Football League, in its capacity as the reserves competition for the Victorian clubs in the AFL were:
1992: Essendon Bombers 18.19 (127) d. Melbourne Demons 14.10 (94)
1993: Melbourne Demons 13.12 (90) d. North Melbourne Kangaroos 7.14 (56)
1994: Footscray Bulldogs 16.16 (112) d.  13.14 (92)
1995: North Melbourne Kangaroos 13.16 (94) d. Sydney Swans 11.14 (80)
1996: North Melbourne Kangaroos 23.18 (156) d. Essendon Bombers 7.10 (52)
1997: Richmond Tigers 17.12 (114) d. Hawthorn Hawks 10.10 (70)
1998: Western Bulldogs 20.16 (136) d. Essendon Bombers 12.8 (80)
1999: Essendon Bombers 20.13 (133) d. St Kilda Saints 11.10 (76)
All Grand Finals were played as curtain-raisers to the AFL Grand Final.

References

Australian rules football governing bodies
Australian rules football in Victoria (Australia)
Sports leagues established in 1991
1991 establishments in Australia